"Beautiful Nebraska" is the regional anthem of the U.S. state of Nebraska. The music was composed by Jim Fras in 1960 and the lyrics were written by Jim Fras and Guy G. Miller, prior to adoption as Nebraska's state song in 1967.

Lyrics

Beautiful Nebraska, peaceful prairie land. Laced with many rivers, and the hills of sand. Dark green valleys cradled in the earth. Rain and sunshine bring abundant birth.

Beautiful Nebraska, as you look around,
you will find a rainbow reaching to the ground.
All these wonders by the Master's hand,
beautiful Nebraska land.

We are so proud of this state where we live.
There is no place that has so much to give.

Beautiful Nebraska, as you look around,
you will find a rainbow reaching to the ground.
All these wonders by the Master's hand,
beautiful Nebraska land.

References

Music of Nebraska
Symbols of Nebraska
Nebraska
Songs about Nebraska